The Murman Coast is a coastal area in Murmansk Oblast in northwest Russia. It is located on the southern side of the Barents Sea, between the Norway–Russia border and Cape Svyatoy Nos. The major rivers flowing to the sea at the coast are the Tuloma and the Voronya.

The coast originally home to coastal Saami by the 13th century became populated by Pomors and Kola Norwegians. The name Murman is bellieved to be a corruption of the word Norman, referring to the Norsemen. In Old Norse this region was referred to as Bjarmaland.

Administratively, the Murman Coast is shared between Pechengsky, Kolsky and Lovozersky Districts of Murmansk Oblast and Zaozyorsk, Vidyayevo, Aleksandrovsk, Murmansk, Severomorsk, Ostrovnoy.

The cities of Zaozyorsk, Gadzhiyevo, Polyarny, Snezhnogorsk, Murmansk, Kola, Severomorsk, Ostrovnoy are all located on the Murman Coast.

The Murman Coast, excluding Murmansk, is a Russian border security zone, intended to protect the borders of the Russian Federation from unwanted activity. In order to visit the zone, a permit issued by the local FSB department is required.

See also
 Bjarmaland
 Kola Norwegians
 Pomor trade
 Russenorsk
 Ushkuyniks
 Viking expansion

References

External links

 

Coasts of Russia
Landforms of Murmansk Oblast
Barents Sea
History of Murmansk Oblast
History of the Arctic
Pomors
Sámi history
Kingdom of Norway (872–1397)
Medieval Norway
Medieval Russia
Norway–Russia relations
Sámi in Russia